Eduan Keyter (born 13 June 1996) is a South African rugby union player for  in the Currie Cup and the Rugby Challenge. His regular position is centre and wing.

References

South African rugby union players
Living people
1996 births
Rugby union centres
Rugby union wings
Griquas (rugby union) players
Sharks (rugby union) players
Sharks (Currie Cup) players
Rugby sevens players at the 2014 African Youth Games